Good Faith is the eighth studio album by Canadian guitarist Rik Emmett, released in 2003. The album touches on different musical styles including reggae, smooth jazz, swing music, folk, classical music and country music.

Track listing

Personnel
 Rik Emmett – guitars, synthesizers, vocals
 Pat Kilbride - Bass Guitar
 Randy Cooke – percussion
 Marty Anderson – Keyboards, Sax (Alto)
 Phil Poppa - Flute, Sax (Tenor), Soloist
 Ian Thomas - Vocals (Background)
 Kathy Martorino - Vocals (Background), Soprano (Vocal)
 Claudio Vena - Accordion, Viola
 Bob Rice - Trumpet, Flugelhorn, Soloist
 Lorraine Lawson - Vocals (Background), Alto (Vocals)
 Jane Bunnett - Sax (Soprano), Soloist

Production
 Rik Emmett – producer
 Tony Daniels - engineer
 Marty Anderson – engineer
 Marty Anderson – mastering
 Jeanine Leech - Digital Imaging, Jacket Design
 Darko - Photography
 Ian Brown - Photography

External links
 Good Faith Entry at the Official Rik Emmett Homepage

Rik Emmett albums
2003 albums
Rockit Sounds albums